The southern deermouse or southern deer mouse (Peromyscus labecula) is a species of rodent in the family Cricetidae. It is found in the United States and Mexico.

Taxonomy 
The species was originally thought to be conspecific with the North American deermouse (now eastern deermouse), P. maniculatus, as P. m. labecula, P. m. blandus, and P. m. fulvus. However, later studies found these subspecies to together comprise a distinct species from P. maniculatus, and they were split from maniculatus in a study published in 2019 as P. labecula, which was followed by the American Society of Mammalogists.

Distribution 
This species is distributed from the Southwestern United States (southern New Mexico and western Texas) south to southern Mexico, in the state of Oaxaca. In the southern portion of its range, it is sympatric with the similar black-eared mouse (P. melanotis).

References 

Peromyscus
Rodents of North America
Mammals of Mexico
Mammals of the United States
Mammals described in 1903